Makhdoom Khalil-u-Zaman is a Pakistani politician who had been a Member of the Provincial Assembly of Sindh, from May 2013 to May 2018.

Early life
He was born in Hala, Sindh.

Political career

He was elected to the Provincial Assembly of Sindh as a candidate of Pakistan Peoples Party from Constituency PS-62 Tharparkar-III in 2013 Pakistani general election.

References

Living people
Sindh MPAs 2013–2018
Pakistan People's Party politicians
Year of birth missing (living people)
 People from Matiari District